Chas Lucas Skelly (born May 11, 1985) is an American retired mixed martial artist who competed in the featherweight division of the Ultimate Fighting Championship. A professional since 2009, he has also competed for Bellator MMA and Legacy Fighting Championship.

Background
Skelly was born in Bedford, Texas, but moved to Pennsylvania at a young age. Skelly began wrestling at the age of five and later moved back to Texas, attending Azle High School where he also played baseball and football, but quit the latter two sports when he was a senior to focus on wrestling. He held an overall record of 164-3, was a four-year letterman, and won a state championship during his senior year in 2003 while competing in the 140 lbs. division. Skelly continued wrestling at the collegiate level for Oklahoma City University where he earned All-American honors with a 7th-place finish at nationals. He began mixed martial arts after he became a wrestling partner for former UFC fighter Johnny Bedford.

Mixed martial arts career

Early career
Skelly made his professional MMA debut in 2009 and won his first two fights in the first round via submission and TKO, respectively. Less than a month after the latter win, he was signed by Bellator MMA.

Bellator MMA
Skelly made his Bellator debut at Bellator 9 on May 29, 2009 and won the fight via split decision.

Still undefeated, Skelly won his next three consecutive fights before making his next appearance for the organization on May 20, 2010 at Bellator 19, facing Daniel Pineda. Skelly had previously defeated Pineda via submission and defeated him again in the rematch via kneebar.

After a two-year layoff due to injuries, Skelly again won his next three consecutive fights before his next appearance for the organization at Bellator 96 on June 19, 2013.  He faced Jarrod Card and won via unanimous decision.

Ultimate Fighting Championship
In March 2014, it was announced that Skelly has signed with the UFC. He made his debut against Mirsad Bektić on April 19, 2014 at UFC on Fox: Werdum vs. Browne. He lost via majority decision. The fight was nearly stopped in the second round as Skelly landed a pair of illegal knees as Bektić was grounded against the cage, prompting the referee to deduct a point and allow him five minutes to recover. Bektić clearly was hurt and wobbled as he returned to his feet but was able to continue after a brief break.

In his second fight for the promotion, Skelly faced Tom Niinimäki on August 23, 2014 at UFC Fight Night 49. He won the fight via submission in the first round.

After taking virtually no damage during his fight with Niinimäki, Skelly faced Sean Soriano on September 5, 2014 at UFC Fight Night 50, replacing an injured Andre Fili. He won the fight via unanimous decision and set the modern era record for shortest time in between UFC wins at 13 days.

Skelly faced Jim Alers on February 14, 2015 at UFC Fight Night 60. He won the fight via TKO in the closing seconds of the second round.

Skelly was briefly linked to a bout against Hacran Dias on June 27, 2015 at UFC Fight Night 70.  However, Skelly was pulled from the card in early June due to illness and replaced by Levan Makashvili.

Skelly faced Kevin Souza on November 7, 2015 at UFC Fight Night 77. Despite being rocked a number of times by Souza's punches, Skelly rallied and won the fight via submission in the second round.

Skelly next faced Darren Elkins on March 5, 2016 at UFC 196. He lost the fight by unanimous decision.

Skelly faced Maximo Blanco on September 17, 2016 at UFC Fight Night 94. He won the fight via submission in the fight's opening minute and was awarded a Performance of the Night bonus.

Skelly faced Chris Gruetzemacher on February 4, 2017 at UFC Fight Night 104. He won the fight via submission in the second round.

Skelly faced Jason Knight on May 13, 2017 at UFC 211. He lost the fight via TKO in the third round. He received a 180-day medical suspension to recover from his injuries.

After more than one year absent from competing, Skelly faced newcomer Bobby Moffett on November 10, 2018 at UFC Fight Night 139. He lost the fight via technical submission. Subsequently, Skelly appealed to the Colorado Office of Combative Sports on grounds of referee error regarding the stoppage. Eventually on June 24, 2020, Skelly announced on his social media account that the result was overturned to no contest.

Skelly was expected to face Jordan Griffin on June 29, 2019 at UFC on ESPN 3. However, on June 13, 2019  Skelly pulled out of the fight citing injury. The pairing eventually took place on September 14, 2019 at UFC on ESPN+ 16. Skelly won the fight by unanimous decision.

Skelly was scheduled to meet Grant Dawson on January 18, 2020 at UFC 246. However, on January 14, 2020, Dawson announced on his personal social media that he was forced to withdraw from the bout. The bout was rescheduled on February 29, 2020 at UFC Fight Night 169.  On February 7, 2020 it was reported that Skelly was injured during one of his training sessions and was forced to withdraw from the event. 

Skelly was scheduled to face Jamall Emmers February 20, 2021 at UFC Fight Night 185.  However, the bout was cancelled moments before it was expected to begin as Emmers suffered back spasms backstage. 

Skelly was expected to face Michael Trizano on October 9, 2021 at UFC Fight Night 194. However, two weeks before the event, Skelly was removed from the bout for undisclosed reasons and the bout was cancelled.

Skelly faced Mark Striegl in what he announced as his retirement bout on February 19, 2022 at UFC Fight Night 201. He won the fight via TKO in the second round.

Championships and accomplishments
Ultimate Fighting Championship
Performance of the Night (One Time) vs. Maximo Blanco
 Record for fastest submission in UFC/WEC history in the featherweight division
 Record for fastest consecutive wins in UFC history (13 days)

Mixed martial arts record

|-
|Win
|align=center|19–3 (1)
|Mark Striegl
|TKO (knee and punches)
|UFC Fight Night: Walker vs. Hill
|
|align=center|2
|align=center|2:01
|Las Vegas, Nevada, United States
|
|-
|Win
|align=center|18–3 (1)
|Jordan Griffin
|Decision (unanimous)
|UFC Fight Night: Cowboy vs. Gaethje 
|
|align=center|3
|align=center|5:00
|Vancouver, British Columbia, Canada
|
|-
|NC
|align=center|17–3 (1)
|Bobby Moffett
|NC (overturned) 
|UFC Fight Night: Korean Zombie vs. Rodríguez 
|
|align=center|2
|align=center|2:43
|Denver, Colorado, United States
|
|-
|Loss
|align=center|17–3
|Jason Knight
|TKO (punches)
|UFC 211
|
|align=center|3
|align=center|0:39
|Dallas, Texas, United States
|
|-
|Win
|align=center|17–2
|Chris Gruetzemacher
|Submission (rear-naked choke)
|UFC Fight Night: Bermudez vs. Korean Zombie
|
|align=center|2
|align=center|2:01
|Houston, Texas, United States
| 
|-
|Win
|align=center|16–2
|Maximo Blanco
|Technical Submission (anaconda choke)
|UFC Fight Night: Poirier vs. Johnson
|
|align=center|1
|align=center|0:19
|Hidalgo, Texas, United States
|
|-
|Loss
|align=center|15–2
|Darren Elkins
|Decision (unanimous) 
|UFC 196
|
|align=center|3
|align=center|5:00
|Las Vegas, Nevada, United States
|
|-
|Win
|align=center|15–1 
|Kevin Souza
|Submission (rear-naked choke)
|UFC Fight Night: Belfort vs. Henderson 3
|
|align=center| 2
|align=center| 1:56
|São Paulo, Brazil
| 
|-
|Win
|align=center|14–1
|Jim Alers
|TKO (punches and knee)
|UFC Fight Night: Henderson vs. Thatch
|
|align=center|2
|align=center|4:59
|Broomfield, Colorado, United States
|
|-
|Win
|align=center|13–1
| Sean Soriano
| Decision (unanimous)
|UFC Fight Night: Jacare vs. Mousasi
|
|align=center|3
|align=center|5:00
|Mashantucket, Connecticut, United States
|
|-
|Win
|align=center|12–1
| Tom Niinimäki
|Submission (rear-naked choke)
|UFC Fight Night: Henderson vs. dos Anjos
|
|align=center|1
|align=center|2:35
|Tulsa, Oklahoma, United States
|
|-
|Loss
|align=center|11–1
| Mirsad Bektić
|Decision (majority)
|UFC on Fox: Werdum vs. Browne
|
|align=center|3
|align=center|5:00
|Orlando, Florida, United States
|
|-
|Win
|align=center|11–0
| Jarrod Card
|Decision (unanimous)
|Bellator 96
|
|align=center|3
|align=center|5:00
|Thackerville, Oklahoma, United States
|
|-
|Win
|align=center|10–0
| Rey Trujilo
|TKO (punches)
|Legacy FC 16
|
|align=center|3
|align=center|4:52
|Dallas, Texas, United States
|
|-
|Win
|align=center|9–0
| Luis Vegas
|Decision (unanimous)
|PFS: Premier Fight Series 1
|
|align=center|3
|align=center|5:00
|Fort Worth, Texas, United States
|
|-
|Win
|align=center|8–0
| Jeremy Myers
|Submission (D'Arce choke)
|XKO 15
|
|align=center|1
|align=center|2:59
|Arlington, Texas, United States
|
|-
|Win
|align=center|7–0
| Daniel Pineda
|Submission (kneebar)
|Bellator 19
|
|align=center|2
|align=center|2:16
|Grand Prairie, Texas, United States
|
|-
|Win
|align=center|6–0
| Tim Snyder
|Submission (rear-naked choke)
|KOK 8: The Uprising
|
|align=center|2
|align=center|2:22
|Austin, Texas, United States
|
|-
|Win
|align=center|5–0
| Daniel Pineda
|Submission (choke) 
|SWC 8: Night of Rumble
|
|align=center|1
|align=center|2:12
|Frisco, Texas, United States
|
|-
|Win
|align=center|4–0
| Jimmy Guzman
|Submission (choke) 
|URC 5: Ultimate Rumble Championships
|
|align=center|2
|align=center|1:55
|Conroe, Texas, United States
|
|-
|Win
|align=center|3–0
| Mike Braswell
|Decision (split)
|Bellator 9
|
|align=center|3
|align=center|5:00
|Monroe, Louisiana, United States
|
|-
|Win
|align=center|2–0
| Joshua Gerber
|TKO (punches)
|XKO: Xtreme Knockout 4
|
|align=center|1
|align=center|1:59
|Arlington, Texas, United States
|
|-
|Win
|align=center|1–0
| Will Samuels
|Submission (choke) 
|XKO: Xtreme Knockout 3
|
|align=center|1
|align=center|2:57
|Arlington, Texas, United States
|

See also
 List of male mixed martial artists

References

External links
 
 

American male mixed martial artists
Living people
People from Bedford, Texas
1985 births
People from Keller, Texas
Mixed martial artists from Texas
Mixed martial artists utilizing collegiate wrestling
Ultimate Fighting Championship male fighters
American male sport wrestlers
Amateur wrestlers